is a type of green tea, composed of the dust, tea buds and small leaves that are left behind after processing Gyokuro or Sencha. Konacha is cheaper than Sencha and is often served at sushi restaurants.

Konacha has a strong flavor and is therefore good for use in cooking.

See also
List of Japanese teas

References

Green tea
Japanese tea